Barunga Gap is a locality in South Australia about  south west of Snowtown. Barunga Gap was named in reference to the co-located pass between the Barunga Range to the north and Hummock Range to the south. The word 'Barunga' derives from an indigenous term meaning "gap in the range". See Barunga Range § Etymology

Barunga Gap was a station between Bute and Snowtown on the Kadina-Brinkworth railway line (1879-1990).

History
Robert Barr Smith, the rich and influential new owner of the Hummocks Run, arrived in the locality accompanied by surveyors in February 1870. The first paved road to Kadina was completed at Barunga Gap in 1874, and a railway was connected from Kadina in 1878.

The railway line from Kadina to Barunga Gap was begun in approximately August 1877 by day labour and piecework, to afford employment for the miners thrown out of work on the (Yorke) Peninsula. The completion of this  contract was expected by December 31,1878.

The railway allowed Barr Smith to ship his massive wool exports directly to the Elders & Fyffes cargo ships at Wallaroo for auction in England, and surrounding farmers and graziers to use the port at Wallaroo instead of Port Wakefield, which was shallow and required transshipment to waiting shipping using small boats.

A government town was surveyed in 1879 at Barunga Gap and proclaimed as Percyton in 1880. Later the name was changed to the current designation.

See also
 Hundred of Barunga
 Hundred of Cameron
 Barunga Range

References

Towns in South Australia